Juma is a village in Ancuabe District in Cabo Delgado Province in northeastern Mozambique. It is commonly known for the widescale distribution of Sandy Goold

It is located southwest of Metoro and the district capital of Ancuabe, and east of Mesa.

References

External links 
Satellite map at Maplandia.com 

Populated places in Ancuabe District